Kōno, Kono or Kouno (written: 河野, 幸野, 高野 or 甲野) is a Japanese surname. Notable people with the surname include:

Kōno Bairei (1844–1895), Japanese painter, book illustrator and art teacher
Kōno Hironaka (1849–1923), Japanese politician and cabinet minister in the Empire of Japan
Kōno Togama (1844–1895), prewar Japanese politician and cabinet minister
Akitake Kōno (1911–1978), Japanese film actor.
Asahachi Kōno (1876–1943), Japanese photographer
Fumiyo Kōno (born 1968), Japanese manga artist
Fusako Kōno (born 1916), former Japanese diver
Hiromichi Kono (1905–1963), Japanese anthropologist and entomologist
Hyōichi Kōno (1958–2001), Japanese adventurer
Kohei Kono (born 1980), Japanese professional boxer
Marika Kōno (born 1994), Japanese voice actress and singer
Masayuki Kono (born 1980), Japanese professional wrestler and mixed martial artist
, Japanese table tennis player
Rin Kono (born 1981), Japanese professional Go player
Shunji Kōno (born 1964), Japanese politician
Shuto Kohno (born 1993), Japanese football player
Taeko Kōno (1926–2015), Japanese writer and critic
Takanori Kono (born 1969), former Japanese Nordic combined skier
Taro Kono (born 1963), Japanese politician, son of Yōhei Kōno
Tensei Kono (1935–2012), Japanese science fiction writer
Tetsuya Kono and Nahoko Kono, passengers on Comair Flight 191
Tommy Kono (1930–2016), Japanese-American Olympic weightlifter
Tomoyuki Kōno (born 1971), Japanese voice actor
Tōru Kōno (1907–1984), Japanese photographer
Yōhei Kōno (born 1937), Speaker of the Japanese House of Representatives, father of Tarō Kōno
Yoshiyuki Kono, Japanese voice actor

See also
Kono (disambiguation)

Japanese-language surnames